The Kativik Regional Government (KGR) is the representative regional authority for most of the Nunavik region of Quebec. Nunavik is the northern half of the Nord-du-Québec administrative region and includes all the territory north of the 55th parallel. The administrative capital is Kuujjuaq, on the Koksoak River, about 50 kilometres inland from the southern end of the Ungava Bay.

In accordance with the 1975 James Bay and Northern Quebec Agreement, the KRG was established by the 1978 Act respecting Northern Villages and the Kativik Regional Government (Kativik Act).

Representation
The Kativik Regional Government includes 14 northern villages, 14 Inuit reserved lands and one Naskapi village municipality. Each Inuit reserved land is near a northern village; the Naskapi village municipality of Kawawachikamach (north of the 55th parallel) is near the Naskapi reserved land that is also called Kawawachikamach, south of the 55th parallel in the Côte-Nord region of Quebec.

The Cree village Whapmagoostui, near the northern village of Kuujjuarapik, on the eastern shore of Hudson Bay, is an enclave in the Nunavik region and its inhabitants do not participate in the Kativik Regional Government. Whapmagoostui (village and reserved lands) is part of the Cree Regional Authority and the Grand Council of the Cree (Eeyou Istchee).

The Inuit of Nunavik are also represented by the Makivik Corporation in their relations with the governments of Quebec and Canada on issues specifically pertaining to their indigenous rights (hunting and land use). The Makivik Corporation supports greater autonomy for the Nunavik region and is headquartered in Kuujjuaq.

Structure
Each of the 14 municipal councils of the northern villages designates one of its elected members to serve as a regional councillor on the Kativik Regional Government. As such, all these councillors have been elected locally by municipal residents, whether Inuit and non-Inuit. An additional regional councillor is designated as a representative from Kawawachikamach, Quebec.

Finances
The Regional Government is financed by the Government of Quebec (50%) and the Government of Canada (25%).

Services

The KRG has mandates to provide the following services:
Airport and marine infrastructure maintenance
Economic and business development
Policing, civil security and assistance to victims of crime
Inuit hunting, fishing and trapping support and wildlife conservation
Environmental research
Parks management
Employment, training and income support
Childcare services
Municipal infrastructure development and drinking water monitoring
Internet access
Sports and recreation

The police service is provided by the Kativik Regional Police Force, which also has its headquarters in Kuujjuaq.

References

External links
Official site of the Kativik Regional Government
Official site of the Makivik Corporation

Local government in Quebec
 
 
Inuit organizations
Nunavik
Indigenous organizations in Quebec